Autochloris vitristriga is a moth of the subfamily Arctiinae. It was described by Herbert Druce in 1897. It is found in Venezuela and Guyana.

References

Arctiinae
Moths described in 1897
Moths of South America